This is the list of railway stations in Nepal.

Railway stations 
 Inarwa
 Khajuri
 Mahinathpur
 Sahib Sarojnagar, Duhabi
 Baidehi, Itaharwa
 Deuri Parbaha
 Janakpur Dham
 Bijalpura, closed.
 Bighi, under construction. 
 Bardibas, under construction.
 Budhanagar, under construction.

See also 
 Nepal Railways 
 Transport in Nepal

References

External links

Railway stations
Nepal
Railway stations